The 1954 Sutton and Cheam by-election was held on 4 November 1954 due to the resignation of the Conservative MP Sydney Marshall.  The seat was retained by the Conservative candidate Richard Sharples.

References

Sutton and Cheam,1954
Sutton and Cheam,1954
Sutton and Cheam,1954
Sutton and Cheam by-election
Sutton and Cheam by-election
Sutton and Cheam by-election
20th century in Surrey
Sutton, London